Findlay Prep is a former high school basketball program located in Henderson, Nevada. The program was created in 2006 by local businessman Cliff Findlay, who owns several car dealerships in the Las Vegas area. Despite closing its high school in 2010 due to the local economic downturn, the Findlay Prep players took high school classes at Henderson International School. Findlay was part of the Nevada Interscholastic Activities Association (NIAA), but they were ineligible to compete in state championships due to the fact that they were allowed to recruit from outside the state. Instead, they competed for National High School Invitational (NHSI) championships, an 8 team tournament featuring the top high school teams in the country played in New York. They won a total of 3 national championships during their time, coming in 2009, 2010, and 2012, all under Mike Peck. Through the years, Findlay has produced 17 NBA players and over 70 Division I athletes. The program produced several international players as well from countries like Lithuania, Senegal, Canada, France, Georgia, and others. They had an all-time record of 381-43 (.899), with only 2 losses ever on their home court.

Paul Washington Sr was named the program's head coach in August 2016. Due to its perceived overemphasis on basketball, critics have slammed it as a basketball factory that gives students hope of a pro career instead of education. School officials refute these allegations arguing their students' "100% qualification rate" with the NCAA. Findlay Prep was branded as "non-scholastic" by the same organisation in 2013 but later affiliated themselves with the NIAA.

In 2019, after the completion of their season, the program unexpectedly shut down for unknown reasons.

Notable players and alumni

 DeAndre Liggins (Class of 2008) – Al-Ahli Jeddah
 Avery Bradley (Class of 2009) – last played for Los Angeles Lakers
 Cory Joseph (Class of 2010) – Detroit Pistons
 Tristan Thompson (Class of 2010) – last played for Chicago Bulls
 Nick Johnson (Class of 2011) – Beijing Ducks
 Anthony Bennett (Class of 2012) – Hsinchu JKO Lioneers
 Nigel Williams-Goss (Class of 2013) – Real Madrid
Christian Wood (Class of 2013) – Dallas Mavericks
Braian Angola (Class of 2014) - Karşıyaka Basket
Kelly Oubre Jr. (Class of 2014) – Charlotte Hornets
Dillon Brooks (Class of 2014) - Memphis Grizzlies
Rashad Vaughn (Class of 2014) – Cleveland Charge
Allonzo Trier (Class of 2015) – last played for Iowa Wolves
Markus Howard (Class of 2016) – Saski Baskonia
Skylar Mays (Class of 2016) – Capitanes de Ciudad de México
P. J. Washington (Class of 2017) – Charlotte Hornets
Bol Bol (Class of 2018) – Orlando Magic

References 

Basketball teams in Nevada
2006 establishments in Nevada
2019 disestablishments in Nevada